The Eagles Building-Strand Theater is a building built in 1921 in Alliance, Ohio, also known as the Wallace Building.  It historically served as a meeting hall and as a theater.  It was listed on the National Register of Historic Places in 1997.

It opened as the Strand Theatre in May 1927, and it closed in 1960.

References

Theatres on the National Register of Historic Places in Ohio
Renaissance Revival architecture in Ohio
Theatres completed in 1921
Buildings and structures in Stark County, Ohio
National Register of Historic Places in Stark County, Ohio
Fraternal Order of Eagles buildings
Clubhouses on the National Register of Historic Places in Ohio